Players and pairs who neither have high enough rankings nor receive wild cards may participate in a qualifying tournament held one week before the annual Wimbledon Tennis Championships.

Seeds

  Thierry Champion (first round, retired)
  Todd Woodbridge (qualifying competition, lucky loser)
  Martin Laurendeau (first round)
  David Engel (first round)
  Alexander Mronz (first round)
  Carlos Costa (qualifying competition, lucky loser)
  Christian Saceanu (first round)
  Broderick Dyke (qualifying competition, lucky loser)
  Nuno Marques (qualifying competition)
  Patrick Baur (second round)
  Chris Pridham (first round)
  Danie Visser (qualified)
  Pieter Aldrich (second round)
  Neil Borwick (second round)
  Gianluca Pozzi (second round)
  Massimo Cierro (second round)
  Jan Siemerink (first round)
  Christian Geyer (first round)
  Nduka Odizor (qualifying competition)
  Patrick McEnroe (first round)
  Diego Nargiso (first round)
  Kim Bong-soo (first round)
  Jonathan Canter (first round)
  Wayne Ferreira (qualified)
  Steve Guy (first round)
  Guillaume Raoux (qualified)
  Menno Oosting (second round)
  Ken Flach (qualified)
  Michael Robertson (qualified)
  Robert Seguso (second round)
  Fernando Roese (first round)
  Shuzo Matsuoka (qualified)

Qualifiers

  Shuzo Matsuoka
  Andreas Lesch
  Michael Robertson
  Rick Leach
  Dirk Dier
  Ken Flach
  Vijay Amritraj
  Guillaume Raoux
  Henrik Holm
  Wayne Ferreira
  Luis Herrera
  Danie Visser
  Dimitri Poliakov
  Ralph Kok
  Neil Broad
  Ronnie Båthman

Lucky losers

  Todd Woodbridge
  Carlos Costa
  Broderick Dyke

Qualifying draw

First qualifier

Second qualifier

Third qualifier

Fourth qualifier

Fifth qualifier

Sixth qualifier

Seventh qualifier

Eighth qualifier

Ninth qualifier

Tenth qualifier

Eleventh qualifier

Twelfth qualifier

Thirteenth qualifier

Fourteenth qualifier

Fifteenth qualifier

Sixteenth qualifier

External links

 1990 Wimbledon Championships – Men's draws and results at the International Tennis Federation

Men's Singles Qualifying
Wimbledon Championship by year – Men's singles qualifying